TV Alterosa is a television station in Belo Horizonte, capital of the Brazilian state of Minas Gerais. It transmits programming of the national Sistema Brasileiro de Televisão in Minas Gerais, as well as  local programs on channels 5 VHF analog and 36 UHF digital.

History 
TV Alterosa was founded on 13 March 1962.

References

External links
 Sistema Brasileiro de Televisão homepage

Diários Associados
Television networks in Brazil
Television channels and stations established in 1962
Mass media in Belo Horizonte
1962 establishments in Brazil